Baleària is the trading name for the Spanish shipping company Baleària Eurolíneas Marítimas S.A.  The company operates passenger ferry services in the Mediterranean and Caribbean.

Routes 
In the Mediterranean region, Baleària operates domestic services within Spain to the Balearic Islands from Dénia, Valencia and Barcelona. The company also operates service across the Strait of Gibraltar from Algeciras to Ceuta and Tangier.

In North America, Baleària operates regular international ferry service between the port of Fort Lauderdale, Florida in the United States and Freeport, Grand Bahama Island and Bimini in the Bahamas. They operate in the US under the name Baleària Caribbean.

Fleet

Current vessels
Baleària currently (September 2019) operates a fleet of thirty vessels.

Past vessels
HSC Al Sabini
MS Bahia de Malaga - Sold to Kada Denizcilik Turism, renamed Med Dream
MS Bahia de Ceuta - Sold to Nova Ferries, renamed Ilha Azul
MS Borja
MS Borja Dos
MS Breant
MS Clipper Racer
MS Espalmador
HSC Federico Garía Lorca - Sold to Conferry, renamed San Francisco de Asís
MS Guido
MS Hoburgen
MS Isla de Botafoc - Sold to Ventouris Ferries, renamed Bari
MS Isla de Ibiza
MS Meloodia
HSC Nixe 2 - Sold to Excalibur International Marine, renamed Ocean Lala
MS Pau Casals
MS Rólon Sur 
MS Sonia
HSC Maverick Dos
HSC Pinar del Rio

Incidents
On 16 February 2012 the high speed ferry Maverick Dos ran aground whilst on passage from Ibiza Town to Formentera. The vessel was carrying 21 passengers and 6 crew at the time of the incident. There was one injury, but all passengers and crew were safely evacuated.

References

Further reading

Ferry companies of Spain
Transport companies established in 1998
1998 establishments in Spain